Chiniquodon is an extinct genus of carnivorous cynodonts, which lived during the Late Triassic (Carnian) in South America (Argentina and Brazil) and Africa (Namibia and Madagascar). Chiniquodon was closely related to the genus Aleodon, and close to the ancestry of mammals.

Other contemporaries included early dinosaurs. As both groups filled a similar ecological niche, fairly large therapsid hunters such as Chiniquodon may have been outcompeted by dinosaurs.

Classification 
Chiniquodon theotonicus, the type species, is from the Santa Maria Formation, Brazil and Chañares Formation, Ischigualasto-Villa Unión Basin, northwestern Argentina. This species is known from a number of skulls. The holotype is in the paleontological collection at Tübingen University, Germany.

Chiniquodon sanjuanensis is from the Cancha de Bochas Member of the Ischigualasto Formation, Ischigualasto-Villa Unión Basin, northwestern Argentina. It was originally assigned to the genus Probelesodon, but was reassigned to this genus in 2002. It is differentiated from C. theotonicus because of its teeth and the shape of the zygomatic process.

Chiniquodon kalanoro is from the Isalo II Formation, Madagascar. This species is known from a mandible (holotype UA 10607).

Chiniquodon omaruruensis is from the Omingonde Formation of Namibia. It is known from a single specimen (GSN F315), consisting of a complete skull and parts of the postcranial skeleton.

References

Further reading 
 Von Huene. Die Fossilien Reptilien des südamerikanischen Gondwanalandes an der Zeitenwende (Denwa-Molteno-Unterkeuper = Ober-Karnisch). Ergebnisse der Sauriergrabungen in Südbrasilien 1928/29. (The fossil reptiles of South American Gondwana during the temporal transition) (Denwa-Molteno-Upper Triassic = Upper Carnian). Results of the excavations in South Brazil 1928/29, part II.) 1936. Pages 93–159.

Prehistoric probainognathians
Prehistoric cynodont genera
Carnian genera
Triassic synapsids of Africa
Late Triassic animals of Africa
Fossils of Madagascar
Triassic Madagascar
Fossils of Namibia
Omingonde Formation
Late Triassic synapsids of South America
Triassic Argentina
Fossils of Argentina
Chañares Formation
Ischigualasto Formation
Triassic Brazil
Fossils of Brazil
Santa Maria Formation
Fossil taxa described in 1936
Taxa named by Friedrich von Huene